Frédéric Ogée is a professor of English literature and art history at Université Paris Diderot. He is a specialist in the art and literature of the eighteenth century.

Selected publications
 R.B.Sheridan - The Critic. In collaboration with Marie-Claire Rouyer. Paris: Didier, 1995.
 Grammaire appliquée de l'anglais, New revised edition, in collaboration with Paul Boucher (Université de Nantes). Paris: Editions CDU-SEDES-NATHAN, 1997. Re-published 2011: 3rd revised edition, Paris: Armand Colin
 The Dumb Show : Image and Society in the Works of William Hogarth. A Collection of essays, in Studies on Voltaire and the Eighteenth Century. Oxford : The Voltaire Foundation, 1997, re-published 2014, POD 2016.
 Henry Fielding - Joseph Andrews, in collaboration with Alain Bony. Paris : Didier, 2000.
 William Hogarth : Representing Nature's Machines. In collaboration with David Bindman (University College London) and Peter Wagner (Universität Landau). Manchester : Manchester University Press, 2001. (with 2 essays by F.Ogée)
 Art & Nation : la fondation de la Royal Academy of Arts, 1768-1836, in collaboration with Isabelle Baudino and Jacques Carré, Paris : Armand Colin, 2004. (2 chapitres)
 ‘Better in France? The circulation of ideas across the Channel in the 18th century. Lewisburg : Bucknell University Press, 2005, 298 p.
 Diderot and European Culture, a collection of essays, in collaboration with Anthony Strugnell, Studies on Voltaire and the Eighteenth Century. Oxford : The Voltaire Foundation, 2006. Republished 2009. 
 Representation and Performance in the Eighteenth Century, in collaboration with Peter Wagner, Trier: Wissenschaftlicher Verlag, 2006.
 Jonathan Richardson : Traité sur la peinture, etc., translation and critical edition, in collaboration with Isabelle Baudino. Paris : ensba, 2008.
 Ossian then and now, recueil d'articles, INTERFACES n°27, 2008
 Ruins and Sketches in the Enlightenment, in collaboration with Peter Wagner, Trier: Wissenschaftlicher Verlag, 2008.
 William Gilpin, Observations on the River Wye, &tc., first French translation, and critical edition, Presses Universitaires de Pau, 2009.
 J.M.W.Turner. Les paysages absolus. Paris : Hazan, 2010. 400 pages
 Taste and the senses in the Eighteenth century, in collaboration with Peter Wagner, Trier: Wissenschaftlicher Verlag, 2012.
 Jonathan Swift, Voyage à Lilliput, New translation, Preface and notes, Paris, Le Livre de poche, 2012.
 The Definition of Colour, a collection of essays, INTERFACES 33, 2012 (http://college.holycross.edu/interfaces/vol33.html)
 Intellectual journeys the translation of ideas in Enlightenment England, France and Ireland, in collaboration with Lise Andries, Darach Sanfey and John Dunkley Volume: SVEC 2013:12. Oxford, Voltaire Foundation, 2013.

References 

French art historians
Living people
Academic staff of the University of Paris
Year of birth missing (living people)